1822 Waterman, provisional designation , is a stony asteroid from the inner regions of the asteroid belt, approximately 6.5 kilometers in diameter.

It was discovered on 25 July 1950, by Indiana University's Indiana Asteroid Program at its Goethe Link Observatory near Brooklyn, Indiana, United States. The asteroid was named after American physicist Alan T. Waterman.

Orbit and classification 

Waterman is a S-type asteroid. It orbits the Sun in the inner main-belt at a distance of 1.8–2.5 AU once every 3 years and 2 months (1,168 days). Its orbit has an eccentricity of 0.15 and an inclination of 1° with respect to the ecliptic. The body's observation arc begins with its official discovery observation, as its first identification, made at the German Sonneberg Observatory in 1943, remained unused.

Physical characteristics

Rotation period 

In January 2013, a rotational lightcurve of Waterman was obtained from photometric observation taken at the U.S Etscorn Observatory in New Mexico. It gave a well-defined rotation period of 7.581 hours with a brightness variation of 0.51 magnitude.

Diameter and albedo 

According to the survey carried out by NASA's Wide-field Infrared Survey Explorer with its subsequent NEOWISE mission, Waterman measures between 6.06 and 6.52 kilometers in diameter, and its surface has an albedo between 0.264 and 0.325. The Collaborative Asteroid Lightcurve Link assumes a standard albedo for stony asteroids of 0.20 and calculates a diameter of 7.46 kilometers with an absolute magnitude of 13.1.

Naming 

This minor planet was named in honor of American physicist Alan Tower Waterman (1892–1967), who was the first director of the U.S. National Science Foundation. He went to Washington to serve with OSRD (1941–45), ONR (1946–51), and NSF (1951–63), after being an academic physicist for 25 years.

Waterman was awarded the Karl Taylor Compton Gold Medal for distinguished statesmanship in science, the Public Welfare Medal and the Presidential Medal of Freedom. The official  was published by the Minor Planet Center on 1 June 1975.

References

External links 
 Asteroid Lightcurve Database (LCDB), query form (info )
 Dictionary of Minor Planet Names, Google books
 Asteroids and comets rotation curves, CdR – Observatoire de Genève, Raoul Behrend
 Discovery Circumstances: Numbered Minor Planets (1)-(5000) – Minor Planet Center
 
 

001822
001822
Named minor planets
19500725